Colegio Hebreo Monte Sinaí A.C. (CHMS; Hebrew: בית הספר העברי הר סיני) is a Jewish private school in Colonia Vista Hermosa, Cuajimalpa, Mexico City. It serves preschool through senior high school.

History
It was established in 1943. It was originally located in Colonia Roma, in Cuauhtémoc, in a building acquired by three people in 1942. In 1966 a new campus opened in Naucalpan, State of Mexico; its headstone was laid in 1965.

It began the International Baccalaureate in 2010.

References

External links
 Colegio Hebreo Monte Sinaí 

Jewish schools in Mexico
Jews and Judaism in Mexico City
High schools in Mexico City
Cuajimalpa
Private schools in Mexico
1943 establishments in Mexico
Educational institutions established in 1943